Leaving Las Vegas is a 1995 American drama film written and directed by Mike Figgis and based on the semi-autobiographical 1990 novel of the same name by John O'Brien. Nicolas Cage stars as a suicidal alcoholic in Los Angeles who, having lost his family and been recently fired, has decided to move to Las Vegas and drink himself to death. He loads a supply of liquor and beer into his BMW and gets drunk as he drives from Los Angeles to Las Vegas. Once there, he develops a romantic relationship with a sex worker played by Elisabeth Shue and the film shifts to include her narrative perspective. O'Brien died from suicide after signing away the film rights to the novel.

Leaving Las Vegas was filmed in super 16 mm instead of 35 mm film; while 16 mm was common for art house films at the time, 35 mm is most commonly used for mainstream film. After limited release in the United States on October 27, 1995, Leaving Las Vegas was released nationwide on February 9, 1996, receiving strong praise from critics and audiences. Cage received the Golden Globe Award for Best Actor - Motion Picture Drama and the Academy Award for Best Actor, while Shue was nominated for the Golden Globe Award for Best Actress - Motion Picture Drama and the Academy Award for Best Actress. The film also received nominations for Best Adapted Screenplay and Best Director.

Plot
Ben Sanderson is an alcoholic Hollywood screenwriter who has lost his job, family, and friends. With nothing left to live for, and a sizable severance check from his boss, he heads to Las Vegas to drink himself to death. One early morning, he drives drunkenly from his Los Angeles home down to the Las Vegas Strip; he nearly hits a woman, Sera, on the crosswalk. She chastises him and walks away.

Sera is a prostitute working for abusive Latvian pimp Yuri Butsov. Polish mobsters are after Yuri, so he ends his relationship with Sera in fear that the Poles may hurt her. On his second day in Las Vegas, Ben looks for Sera, introduces himself, and offers her $500 to come to his room for an hour. Sera agrees, but Ben does not want sex. Instead, they talk and develop a rapport; Sera invites Ben to move into her apartment. Ben instructs Sera never to ask him to stop drinking. Ben says he will not criticize her occupation either and she thanks him.

At first, the pair are happy but soon become frustrated with the other's behavior. Sera begs Ben to see a doctor, which he refuses. While Sera is working, Ben goes to a casino and returns with another prostitute. Sera returns to find them in her bed and throws Ben out. Shortly afterward, Sera is approached by three college students at the Excalibur Hotel and Casino. She initially rejects their offer by stating that she only "dates" one at a time but eventually acquiesces when she is offered an increased price. When she enters their hotel room, the students change the deal and demand anal sex, which she refuses. When she attempts to leave, they violently gang-rape her.

The following day, Sera is spotted by her landlady returning home bruised and is evicted. Sera receives a call from Ben, who is on his deathbed. Sera visits Ben, and the two make love, and he dies shortly thereafter. Later, Sera explains to her therapist that she accepted Ben for who he was and loved him.

Cast

 Nicolas Cage as Ben Sanderson
 Elisabeth Shue as Sera
 Julian Sands as Yuri Butsov
 Richard Lewis as Peter
 Steven Weber as Marc Nussbaum
 Emily Procter as Debbie
 Valeria Golino as Terri
 Thomas Kopache as Mr. Simpson
 Laurie Metcalf as Mrs. Van Houten
 French Stewart as Business Man #2
 R. Lee Ermey as Conventioneer
 Mariska Hargitay as Hooker at Bar
 Julian Lennon as Bartender #3 in Biker Bar
 Graham Beckel as L.A. Bartender
 Albert Henderson as Man at Strip Bar
 Carey Lowell as Bank Teller
 Vincent Ward as Businessman #1
 Lucinda Jenney as Weird Woman
 Ed Lauter as Mobster #3
 Mike Figgis as Mobster #1
 Danny Huston as Bartender #2
 Shawnee Smith as Biker Girl
 Bob Rafelson as Man at Mall
 Marc Coppola as Dealer
 Michael Goorjian as College Boy #1 (as Michael A. Goorjian)
 Jeremy Jordan as College Boy #2
 Xander Berkeley as Cynical Cabbie
 Lou Rawls as Concerned Cabbie

Production

Development
Mike Figgis based Leaving Las Vegas on a 1990 autobiographical novel by John O'Brien, who died of suicide in April 1994, shortly after finding out his novel was being used as the basis for a film. Despite basing most of his screenplay on O'Brien's novel, Figgis spoke of a personal attachment with the novel, stating "Anything I would do would be because I had a sympathetic feeling towards it. That's why I did Mr. Jones, because I think manic-depression is a fascinating, sad, and amazing phenomenon. It's not a coincidence that some of the greatest artists have been manic-depressives. That made it, to me, a fascinating subject that, alas, did not come out in the film."

Casting
Figgis encouraged the lead actors to experience their characters' ordeals first-hand by extensive research. He told Film Critic: "It was just a week and a half of rehearsal. A lot of conversations. A lot of communication in the year before we made the film. Reading the book. I encouraged them [Cage and Shue] to do their own research, which they wanted to do anyway, and then ultimately the three of us got together and just started talking...talking about anything, not necessarily about the film or the script, about anything that came up." Cage researched by binge drinking in Dublin for two weeks and had a friend videotape him so he could study his speech. He also visited hospitalized career alcoholics. He said "it was one of the most enjoyable pieces of research I've ever had to do for a part." Shue spent time interviewing several Las Vegas prostitutes.

Filming
The limited budget dictated the production and Figgis ended up filming in super 16mm and composing his own score. He said "We didn't have any money, and we weren't pretending to be something we weren't. We couldn't shut down The Strip to shoot". Cage recounted that he found the use of 16mm liberating as an actor stating in a 1995 interview with Roger Ebert: 

Figgis had problems because permits were not issued for some street scenes. This caused him to film some scenes on the Las Vegas strip in one take to avoid the police, which Figgis said benefited production and the authenticity of the acting, remarking "I've always hated the convention of shooting on a street, and then having to stop the traffic, and then having to tell the actors, 'Well, there's meant to be traffic here, so you're going to have to shout.' And they're shouting, but it's quiet and they feel really stupid, because it's unnatural. You put them up against a couple of trucks, with it all happening around them, and their voices become great". Filming took place over 28 days.

Release
Leaving Las Vegas had a limited release on October 27, 1995. As it won awards from multiple film critics’ organizations and earned four Academy Award nominations, the film's release was expanded and it ultimately opened nationwide on February 9, 1996. United Artists distributed the film in North America, while RCV Film Distribution and Atalanta Filmes handled the European release, and 21st Century Film Corporation distributed the film in Australia. MGM/UA reportedly spent less than $2 million marketing the film, which included TV spots and ads in industry publications.

Reception
The film was a success at the box office, particularly considering its budget, grossing $49.8 million.

On Rotten Tomatoes, the film received an approval rating of 91% based on 53 reviews, with an average rating of 7.7/10. The website's critical consensus reads, "Oscar-awarded Nicolas Cage finds humanity in his character as it bleeds away in this no frills, exhilaratingly dark portrait of destruction." It also holds a score of 82 out of 100 on Metacritic, based on 23 critics, indicating "universal acclaim".

Roger Ebert from Chicago Sun-Times and Rick Groen from The Globe and Mail gave the film high marks. Ebert wrote, "If there are two unplayable roles in the stock repertory, they are the drunk and the whore with a heart of gold. Cage and Shue make these cliches into unforgettable people." Ebert named the film "best of 1995" and included it in his "best of the decade" list in the number 8 spot. Leonard Klady from Variety wrote Leaving Las Vegas was "certainly among a scant handful of films that have taken an unflinching view of dependency."

Accolades

Home media 
Video cassettes and DVD of the film were distributed by MGM Home Entertainment. The video cassettes were distributed on November 12, 1996 in two languages, English and Russian, while the DVD was distributed on January 1, 1998 in English for USA and Canada. Australian and UK editions later were released. The DVD contains a supplemental "Hidden Page" menu feature. The film was also released on Blu-ray, HD DVD and LaserDisc.

Soundtrack
A soundtrack album, consisting mainly of film score composed and performed by Mike Figgis, was released November 7, 1995. The soundtrack also included three jazz standards performed by Sting and excerpts of dialogue from the film. A version of "Lonely Teardrops" performed by Michael McDonald that features in the film is not included.

See also
 List of films set in Las Vegas

Notes

References

Further reading

External links

 
 
 
 

1995 films
1995 romantic drama films
1990s erotic drama films
American independent films
1995 independent films
American romantic drama films
American erotic drama films
American erotic romance films
Films about alcoholism
Films about prostitution in the United States
Films about sexuality
Films about suicide
Films about rape
Films based on American novels
Films directed by Mike Figgis
Films featuring a Best Actor Academy Award-winning performance
Films featuring a Best Drama Actor Golden Globe winning performance
Films set in the Las Vegas Valley
Films shot in the Las Vegas Valley
Independent Spirit Award for Best Film winners
Films about depression
Metro-Goldwyn-Mayer films
United Artists films
Films shot in 16 mm film
1990s English-language films
1990s American films